Dendrophilia caraganella is a moth of the family Gelechiidae. It was described by Ponomarenko in 1993. It is found in Russia (Primorskii krai).

The larvae feed on Caragana ussuriensis.

References

caraganella
Moths described in 1993